The 1969 World Table Tennis Championships mixed doubles was the 30th edition of the mixed doubles championship.  

Nobuhiko Hasegawa and Yasuko Konno defeated Mitsuru Kono and Saeko Hirota in the final by three sets to nil.

Results

See also
 List of World Table Tennis Championships medalists

References

-